The 1997 Oklahoma State Cowboys football team represented Oklahoma State University during the 1997 NCAA Division I-A football season. They participated as members of the Big 12 Conference in the South Division. They played their home games at Lewis Field in Stillwater, Oklahoma. They were coached by head coach Bob Simmons.

Schedule

After the season

The 1998 NFL Draft was held on April 18–19, 1998. The following Cowboys were selected.

References

Oklahoma State
Oklahoma State Cowboys football seasons
Oklahoma State Cowboys football